North Carolina is currently divided into 14 congressional districts, each represented by a member of the United States House of Representatives. After the 2000 census, the number of North Carolina's seats was increased from 12 to 13 due to the state's increase in population. In the 2022 elections, per the 2020 United States census, North Carolina gained one new congressional seat for a total of 14.

Current districts and representatives
List of members of the United States House delegation from North Carolina, their terms, their district boundaries, and the district political ratings according to the CPVI. The delegation has a total of 14 members, with 7 Republicans, and 7 Democrats. These districts reflect the districts drawn and passed by the North Carolina General Assembly were used for the 2020 elections.

Legal challenges to redistricting

1981 redistricting 
In 1981 the General Assembly proposed a congressional redistricting plan that split Moore County between two districts, the first time a county in North Carolina had ever been thus divided. The Attorney General of North Carolina recommended revising the plan.

Constitutionality of the 1990 redistricting 
After the 1990 census, the US Department of Justice directed North Carolina under VRA preclearance to submit a map with two majority-minority districts. The resultant map with two such districts, the 1st and 12th, was the subject of lawsuits by voters who claimed that it was an illegal racial gerrymander. A three-judge panel of the United States District Court for the Eastern District of North Carolina dismissed the suit, which was appealed to the U.S. Supreme Court. On June 28, 1993, the U.S. Supreme Court, in Shaw v. Reno, found that the 12th congressional district was an unlawful racial gerrymander. Justice Sandra Day O'Connor's opinion found that if a district's shape, like the 12th's, was "so bizarre on its face that it is 'unexplainable on grounds other than race'," that it would be subject to strict scrutiny as a racial gerrymander, and remanded the case to the Eastern District of North Carolina.

On August 22, 1994, the District Court on remand in Shaw v. Hunt found that the 12th congressional district was a racial gerrymander (as the Supreme Court had directed), but ruled that the map satisfied strict scrutiny due to the compelling interest of compliance with the Voting Rights Act and increasing black political power. This was again appealed to the Supreme Court, which reversed the District Court on June 13, 1996, and found that the North Carolina plan violated the Equal Protection Clause and that the 12th District did not satisfy a compelling interest.

Constitutionality of the 1997 redistricting 
North Carolina drew a new map following Shaw v. Hunt, and the new maps were challenged in turn. A three-judge panel of the Eastern District of North Carolina granted summary judgment that the new boundaries were an illegal racial gerrymander. This was appealed to the U.S. Supreme Court, which in Hunt v. Cromartie on May 17, 1999, unanimously ruled that the District Court was in error to grant summary judgment and remanded the case for the District Court to hold a trial.

After the ensuing trial, the District Court ruled that the 12th District was an illegal racial gerrymander on March 7, 2000. This was again appealed, now as Easley v. Cromartie. The U.S. Supreme Court on April 18, 2001, reversed the District Court and ruled that the 12th district boundaries were not racially based but was a partisan gerrymander. They said this was a political question that the courts should not rule upon. Justice O'Connor, the author of Shaw v. Hunt, was the swing justice who switched sides to uphold the district boundaries.

Constitutionality of the 2010 redistricting 
In February 2016, a three-judge panel of U.S. Court of Appeals for the Fourth Circuit and U.S. District Court for the Middle District of North Carolina judges ruled that the 1st and 12th districts' boundaries were unconstitutional and required new maps to be drawn by the legislature to be used for the 2016 election. On 22 May 2017, the U.S. Supreme Court, in Cooper v. Harris, agreed that the 1st and 12th congressional district boundaries were unlawful racial gerrymanders, the latest in a series of cases dating back to 1993 by different parties challenging various configurations of those districts since their first creation.

In January 2018 a federal court struck down North Carolina's congressional map, declaring it unconstitutionally gerrymandered to favor Republican candidates. The court ordered that the North Carolina General Assembly must redraw the district maps prior to the 2018 congressional elections. However, the United States Supreme Court stayed the federal court order pending review, and in June 2019, the Supreme Court ruled in Rucho v. Common Cause, by a 5–4 vote, that partisan gerrymandering is a "political question" that the federal courts have no place to rule on.

Constitutionality of the 2017 redistricting 

On 3 September 2019 a three-judge panel in a 357-page ruling unanimously struck down the Republican-led state legislature drawn 2017 enacted maps, which were drawn to replace the 2011 maps which were also ruled unconstitutional and thrown out on racial grounds. The court ruled that the state House and state Senate districts maps were such an extreme partisan gerrymander that they violated the state constitution. In the ruling the state legislature was ordered by the court to immediately start drawing new maps; the court demanded that they be drawn based on criteria like population, contiguity, and county lines. Districts had to be drawn without "partisan considerations and election results data," and done so in plain view, a departure from the closed-door processes the ruling eschews. "At a minimum, that would require all map drawing to occur at public hearings, with any relevant computer screen visible to legislators and public observers." The judges said the new maps had to be completed in two weeks; they also said they reserved the right to move the 2020 primary election if needed.

In October 2019, a panel of three judges ruled that the map was an unfair partisan gerrymander and had to be redrawn. On 15 November 2019 the North Carolina General Assembly passed a bill that drew new districts that were used for the 2020 elections. The 2nd and 6th districts were drawn to be more favorable to Democrats under the new proposal. On 2 December 2019 a three-judge panel ruled that newly Republican-drawn congressional district maps completed in November 2019 would stand for federal elections in 2020. The maps allowed to stay in place on 2 December 2019 would only be used once. After the 2020 United States census the congressional districts will be redrawn again in 2021.

Constitutionality of the 2020 redistricting

On February 4, 2022, the North Carolina Supreme Court struck down the congressional district and state legislative maps drawn by the GOP-controlled General Assembly as an unconstitutional partisan gerrymander in a 4-3 ruling, after a testimony had shown that Republicans were likely to win 10 out of 14 U.S. House seats under the proposed map, up from the 8 out of 13 that they won in the 2020 elections. New maps, which were ordered to be fair in partisan composition, had to be drawn by the General Assembly within two weeks, under state law.

On February 23, 2022, a panel of three former judges chosen by the Wake County Superior Court drew new remedial congressional maps after the court, earlier that day, struck down the congressional district maps passed by the General Assembly on February 17, 2022, as not meeting standards of partisan fairness. The new maps, which were upheld by the North Carolina Supreme Court later in the night, would apply for the 2022 elections. The General Assembly would then be able to redraw new congressional maps for use in 2024 and subsequent elections until new maps will have to be redrawn for 2032.

Historical and present district boundaries
Table of United States congressional district boundary maps in the State of North Carolina, presented chronologically. All redistricting events that took place in North Carolina between 1973 and 2013 are shown, congressional composition is listed on the right.

See also

List of United States congressional districts
Shaw v. Reno - historic Supreme Court case relating to gerrymandering
North Carolina Democratic Party
North Carolina Libertarian Party
North Carolina Republican Party

References

External links
Libertarian Party of North Carolina
North Carolina Democratic Party
North Carolina Republican Party